Emirati may refer to:
pertaining to the country of United Arab Emirates
the people of the United Arab Emirates, see Emiratis
Emirati culture